Earl of Iveagh (pronounced  —especially in Dublin—or  ) is a title in the Peerage of the United Kingdom, created in 1919 for the businessman and philanthropist Edward Guinness, 1st Viscount Iveagh. He was the third son of Sir Benjamin Guinness, 1st Baronet, of Ashford, and the great-grandson of Arthur Guinness, the founder of the Guinness brewery.

Guinness had already been created a baronet, of Castle Knock in the County of Dublin, in 1885. He was subsequently made Baron Iveagh, of Iveagh in the County of Down, in 1891, then Viscount Iveagh, of Iveagh in the County of Down, in 1905, and was made Viscount Elveden, of Elveden in the County of Suffolk, at the same time that he was given the earldom in 1919. All titles are in the Peerage of the United Kingdom.

As of 2015, the titles are held by his great-great-grandson, the fourth Earl, who succeeded his father in 1992.

The Conservative politician Walter Guinness, 1st Baron Moyne, was the third son of the first Earl.

The family seat is Elveden Hall, near Elveden, Suffolk, formerly residence of Duleep Singh, the last Maharaja of the Sikh Empire, purchased by the first earl in 1894.

Earls of Iveagh (1919)

The heir apparent is the current Earl's son, Arthur Guinness, Viscount Elveden.

Arms

See also
Guinness baronets, of Ashford
Baron Moyne
Guinness family
McCartan Chiefs of Kinelarty

Notes

References

External links
 Cracroft's Peerage online

 
1919 establishments in the United Kingdom
Earldoms in the Peerage of the United Kingdom
Earl
Noble titles created in 1919